Joaquín López may refer to:

 Joaquín Lopez (field hockey) (born 1990), Brazilian field hockey player
 Joaquin Lopez (Argentine footballer) (born 1995), Argentine footballer
 Joaquin Lopez (Chilean footballer), Chilean footballer
 Joaquín María López y López (1798–1855), Spanish politician, writer and journalist, twice Prime Minister of Spain
 Joaquín López-Dóriga (born 1947), Spanish Mexican journalist
 Joaquín López Menéndez (1939–2019), Spanish mayor